James Patrick Keleher (born July 31, 1931) is an American prelate of the Roman Catholic Church. He served as bishop of the Diocese of Belleville in Illinois from 1984 to 1993 and as archbishop of the Archdiocese of Kansas City in Kansas from 1993 to 2005.

Biography

Early life and education
James Keleher was born on July 31, 1931, on the South Side of Chicago, Illinois, to James and Rita (née Cullinane) Keleher. His mother was born in County Kerry, Ireland, and came to Chicago in the 1920s, later abandoning her occupation as a registered nurse to raise her children. His father was a salesman for Will & Baumer Candle Company, a liturgical candle manufacturer.

James Keleher belonged to St. Felicitas Parish in Chicago, and briefly considered a career as a firefighter as child. After attending Mount Carmel High School in Chicago for one year, he entered Archbishop Quigley Preparatory Seminary in Chicago, graduating in 1951. He then studied philosophy and theology at St. Mary of the Lake Seminary in Mundelein, Illinois.

Priesthood
Keleher was ordained to the priesthood for the Archdiocese of Chicago by Cardinal  Samuel Stritch on April 12, 1958. After his ordination, Keleher continued his studies at St. Mary of the Lake, obtaining a Doctor of Sacred Theology degree in 1962 with a dissertation on the writings of St. Augustine. He also served during this time as chaplain and confessor to the Benedictine Sisters of Perpetual Adoration at their monastery in Clyde, Missouri.

In 1962, Keleher was named an associate pastor at St. Henry's Parish in the Rogers Park section of Chicago.  In 1966, he also became academic dean and teacher of religion and social studies at the North Campus of Archbishop Quigley Preparatory Seminary in Chicago.

In 1969, Keleher was appointed dean of formation at Niles College Seminary in Chicago, then in 1972 took the same position at St. Mary of the Lake.  His next position was as rector of the South Campus of Quigley until 1978. During this period, he also furthered his studies in spiritual theology at Rome. In 1978 Keleher was named president and rector of St. Mary of the Lake, where he also served as an associate professor of systematic theology.

Bishop of Belleville
On October 23, 1984, Pope John Paul II appointed Keleher as the sixth bishop of the Diocese of Belleville. He was consecrated on  December 11, 1984, by Cardinal Joseph Bernardin, with Bishops William Cosgrove and Thomas Murphy serving as co-consecrators.

Archbishop of Kansas City 
Following the retirement of Archbishop Ignatius Strecker, Keleher was named the third archbishop of the archdiocese of Kansas City, Kansas, on June 28, 1993 by John Paul II. He was installed at the Cathedral of St. Peter the Apostle in Kansas City, Kansas, on September 8, 1993.

In 1996, Keleher started an education program to fight child sexual abuse in the archdiocese and instituted a background questionnaire for anyone working with children.  Keleher established an independent review board in 2002 to investigate and issue recommendations on all allegations of sexual abuse.  In 2003, he instituted VIRTUS, a national child abuse prevention program.

On January 7, 2004, John Paul II appointed Bishop Joseph Fred Naumann to serve as coadjutor archbishop for the archdiocese. On February 21, 2004, Keleher requested that parishes and other Catholic institutions within the archdiocese stop inviting politicians who support abortion rights for women to any events.  This request was precipitated by the University of St. Mary in Leavenworth, Kansas, inviting then Governor Kathleen Sebelius, a Catholic who supports abortion rights, to speak at an event.

Retirement and legacy 
On January 15, 2005, Keleher submitted his letter of resignation to Pope Benedict XVI, having reached the minimum retirement age for bishops.  Later that year, Keleher started teaching part time at St. Mary of the Lakes Seminary. Keleher has also visited state prisons in Kansas on a regular basis, including the celebration of a Chrism Mass in April 2011 at the Topeka Correction Facility in Topeka, Kansas.

See also
 

 Catholic Church hierarchy
 Catholic Church in the United States
 Historical list of the Catholic bishops of the United States
 List of Catholic bishops of the United States
 Lists of patriarchs, archbishops, and bishops

References

External links

Roman Catholic Archdiocese of Kansas City in Kansas Official Site

Episcopal succession

1931 births
Living people
People from Chicago
20th-century Roman Catholic archbishops in the United States
21st-century Roman Catholic archbishops in the United States
Roman Catholic bishops of Belleville
Roman Catholic archbishops of Kansas City in Kansas